The Capture of Aguililla was a battle between Mexican troops and Jalisco New Generation Cartel, when Jalisco New Generation Cartel  ambushed the National Guard in Aguililla the hometown of Nemesio Oseguera Cervantes, leaving 15 dead.

The Jalisco New Generation Cartel arrived in Aguililla making blockades in the highways. Soon after Federal authorities met with the Governor of Michoacán, Silvano Aureoles, to find a peaceful resolution. The next day Police officers were attacked with shots and grenades using drones, manned by members of the Jalisco New Generation Cartel. Two elements were injured after that.

In February 10 of 2022, members of the National Guard and the army, retake the town and the traffic was restored in 43 towns located in the municipalities of Aguililla, Buenavista, Coalcomán and Tepalcatepec, the authorities said. Six long weapons, 23 improvised explosive devices, 21 vehicles, three of them with handmade armor, and equipment such as radio transmitters or bulletproof vests were also seized.

See also 

 Narcoculture in Mexico
 2011 Mexican protests
 2011–12 in the Mexican drug war
 Borderland Beat
 Blog del Narco
 Drug liberalization
 Mérida Initiative
 Naval operations of the Mexican drug war
 Timeline of the Mexican drug war
 Uppsala Conflict Data Program
 War on drugs
 Crime in Mexico
 Narcoterrorism
 List of ongoing armed conflicts
List of journalists and media workers killed in Mexico
List of politicians killed in the Mexican drug war

References

Battles of the Mexican drug war
Organized crime conflicts in Mexico